The Hartmannellidae are a family of amoebozoa, usually found in soils.  When active they tend to be roughly cylindrical in shape, with a single leading pseudopod and no subpseudopodia.  This form somewhat resembles a slug and as such they are also called limax amoebae.  Trees based on rRNA show the Hartmannellidae as usually defined are paraphyletic to the Amoebidae, which may adopt similar forms.

References

External links

Amoebozoa families